Akbou District is a district of Béjaïa Province, Algeria.

Municipalities
The district is further divided into 4 municipalities:
Akbou
Chelata
Ighram
Tamokra

References

Districts of Béjaïa Province